Wei Yao-chien (born 5 February 1950) is a Taiwanese politician.

Early life and career
Wei was born on 5 February 1950 in Tainan to a conservative family with strong ties to the Kuomintang. He attended the University of Essex and completed further study at Harvard University as well as Yale University before he was trained as a dentist. He later earned a master's degree in political science at National Taiwan University.

Political career
His friendship with Frank Hsieh also contributed to Wei's political beliefs. Wei represented Tainan for two terms on the Legislative Yuan, from 1990 to 1996, as a member of the Democratic Progressive Party. During his legislative tenure, Wei became known for fighting fellow lawmakers. Wei alluded to his dental practice in describing physical confrontation attempts to "pull the tiger's teeth." Wei left the Democratic Progressive Party to run an independent campaign for the Tainan County magistracy in 2001. Though a July 2001 opinion poll showed that Wei had not garnered much support, a potential split in the Pan-Green Coalition's voter base between Wei and Su Huan-chih was still considered damaging to Su. Wei's campaign was run by former Tainan deputy magistrate Lin Wen-ding. Wei was placed on the Home Party list during the 2008 legislative elections, but not elected to the Legislative Yuan. He contested the Lienchiang County magistracy as an independent in 2018.

Activism
In 2006, Wei served as executive director of the Million Voices Against Corruption, President Chen Must Go campaign led by Shih Ming-teh. In this position, Wei acted as a spokesman and represented the campaign to the Legislative Yuan. In February 2014, Wei founded the Jiawu Regime Change organization alongside fellow former legislators  and Payen Talu, among others, to advocate Taiwan independence. Wei was in attendance at Tsai Ing-wen's presidential inauguration on 20 May 2016, alongside a group of protestors advocating for the replacement of the Constitution of the Republic of China with a Taiwan-centric supreme law. In 2018, Wei and another former legislator, led a demonstration on the 71st anniversary of the 228 incident, again in support of a rewritten constitution for Taiwan.

References

1950 births
Living people
Tainan Members of the Legislative Yuan
Members of the 1st Legislative Yuan in Taiwan
Members of the 2nd Legislative Yuan
Democratic Progressive Party Members of the Legislative Yuan
Taiwanese dentists
Taiwanese people of Hoklo descent
Taiwan independence activists
Alumni of the University of Essex
National Taiwan University alumni